The Snyder House is a historic house at 4004 South Lookout Street in Little Rock, Arkansas.  It is a -story wood frame with a distinctive blend of American Craftsman and Colonial Revival elements, built in 1925 to a design by the Little Rock firm of Sanders and Ginocchio.  Its gable roof is bracketed, and it features an entry portico supported by large Tuscan columns.  The gable of the portico has false half-timbering.

The house was listed on the National Register of Historic Places in 1982.

See also
National Register of Historic Places listings in Little Rock, Arkansas

References

Houses on the National Register of Historic Places in Arkansas
Colonial Revival architecture in Arkansas
Houses completed in 1925
Houses in Little Rock, Arkansas
National Register of Historic Places in Little Rock, Arkansas
Historic district contributing properties in Arkansas